is a Japanese tokusatsu drama serving as the 17th Heisei Kamen Rider Series, and 26th series overall. Takuro Fukuda serves as Ghosts lead screenwriter, with Satoshi Morota as director. It premiered on TV Asahi and affiliate stations throughout Japan on October 4, 2015, the week following the finale of its predecessor series Kamen Rider Drive, joining Shuriken Sentai Ninninger, and later, Doubutsu Sentai Zyuohger in the Super Hero Time programming block.

Story

Takeru Tenkūji, whose father was a ghost hunter who died 10 years earlier, dies at the hands of an evil monster known as a  while trying to protect his childhood friend Akari Tsukimura from an attack. The hermit tells Takeru that he has 99 days to gather 15 additional heroic Eyecons to be brought back to life permanently, and must fight the Gamma as Kamen Rider Ghost to obtain them. He is assisted by the Buddhist monk Onari, who previously supported his father as a ghost hunter, and Akari, who tries to find more scientific and logical reasons behind their supernatural encounters. In his way are Makoto Fukami, a mysterious living young man capable of utilizing a Ghost Driver to transform into , and the Gamma led by Chikara Saionji, an associate of Takeru's late father, and Alain, the son of the Gamma leader, who later acquires the means to transform into the anti-hero .

The Riders of Kamen Rider Ghost use Eyecons to transform and summon the hooded jacket-like spirits called  like the spirits of historical figures such as Miyamoto Musashi, Thomas Edison, Tutankhamun and Isaac Newton to grant them new powers.

Casting and production
The Kamen Rider Ghost trademark was registered by Toei on April 28, 2015.

Shun Nishime is the lead actor of Kamen Rider Ghost, portraying the hero Takeru Tenkūji. At only 17 years old, he is one of the youngest actors to portray the leading role in a Kamen Rider Series, coming after Masaki Suda from Kamen Rider W who was 16 at the time of filming and tying with Takeru Satoh from Kamen Rider Den-O. The rest of the cast includes female lead Hikaru Ohsawa, the rival Kamen Rider Ryosuke Yamamoto, Takayuki Yanagi, Yoshiyuki Morishita, Hayato Isomura, and Naoto Takenaka.

Japanese rock band Kishidan performs the television series' opening theme song. When Kishidan's involvement was announced, lead singer Show Ayanocozey joked that he was very worried about writing the song, but consulted with Takashi Niigaki on how to write songs about ghosts.

Episodes

Much like some of Gaim's earlier episodes, the episode titles for this series are all in the form of a exclamatory sentences, with the first one being exactly two kanji long much like Kuuga's episodes.

Films
Kamen Rider Ghost had made his debut as a cameo in Kamen Rider Drive: Surprise Future.

Super Movie War Genesis
 
 was released in Japanese theaters on December 12, 2015. It featured a crossover between Kamen Rider Ghost and Kamen Rider Drive. The events of the movie take place in an alternate timeline due to a space-time anomaly according to the novel.

Kamen Rider 1
 
 was released in Japanese theaters on March 26, 2016. It is part of the 45th anniversary of the Kamen Rider Series, featuring the cast from Kamen Rider Ghost and a new form of Kamen Rider 1, with Hiroshi Fujioka reprising his role as his character. The events of the movie take place between Episode 35 and 36.

The 100 Eyecons and Ghost's Fated Moment

 was released in Japanese theaters on August 6, 2016, double-billed with the film for Doubutsu Sentai Zyuohger. It introduces the antagonists Kamen Rider Dark Ghost/Extremer, three Kamen Rider Dark Necroms, and the movie's supporting protagonist Kamen Rider Zero Specter. It also features a cameo appearance of the next titular character, Kamen Rider Ex-Aid, who later reappeared in the final episode, along with the appearance of Bugstars, while Kamen Rider Genm only appeared in the two last episodes. The events of the movie take place between Episode 42 and 43.

Kamen Rider Heisei Generations: Dr. Pac-Man vs. Ex-Aid & Ghost with Legend Rider
A Movie War film, titled , was released in Japan on December 10, 2016. The film features Kamen Rider Ghost teaming up with Kamen Rider Ex-Aid, Kamen Rider Drive, Kamen Rider Gaim, and Kamen Rider Wizard as they battle against a virus based on Bandai Namco Entertainment's video game character, Pac-Man. The events of the film took place after the end of the main series.

Heisei Generations Final

A Movie War film, titled  was released on December 9, 2017. Along the casts of Kamen Rider Build and Kamen Rider Ex-Aid, Shu Watanabe and Ryosuke Miura (Kamen Rider OOO), Sota Fukushi (Kamen Rider Fourze), Gaku Sano (Kamen Rider Gaim), and Shun Nishime (Kamen Rider Ghost) reprised their respective roles.

Specials

Special episodes
 is a special Televi-Kun DVD. It features both the Ikkyu Ghost Eyecon and the Pythagoras Ghost Eyecon.
 is Televi-Kuns . It features both Kamen Rider Ghost Ikkyu Damashii and Kamen Rider Specter Pythagoras Damashii.
 is a web series released on YouTube. It is connected to Kamen Rider 1 and features Kamen Rider Ghost and Kamen Rider Specter's Legend Rider Damashii confronting villains from past Kamen Rider Series. It comprises seven episodes, but the final episode is exclusive to the DVD.
 is included as part of the Blu-ray releases of Kamen Rider Ghost. It comprises four episodes and focuses on a side story of Alain. The theme song is "TIMELESS BLUE" performed by SUNAHO.
 is Televi-Kuns "Hyper Battle DVD". It takes place after the end of the series, revealing why Da Vinci wasn't chosen to be among the 15 Heroic Eyecons and closing several plotlines from the show and movies, while also introducing the actual Da Vinci Ghost Eyecon.

Ghost Re:Birth
 is a V-Cinema release that focuses on a side story of Makoto Fukami as Kamen Rider Specter, it is set after the end of the series and also features a flashback when Makoto first meet Alain. It features both final forms of both Specter and Necrom respectively. The V-Cinema was released on April 19, 2017. The theme song is "NEW WORLD" performed by Bentham. The film is written by Takuro Fukuda, and directed by Kazuya Kamihoriuchi.

Kamen Rider Saber × Ghost series
 is a web-exclusive series of Toei Tokusatsu Fan Club serves as a crossover between Kamen Rider Saber and Ghost, with Takeru Tenkūji and Kanon Fukami are recurrently starring characters of the series:
 Kamen Rider Saber × Ghost is the titular first entry of the web series released on May 23, 2021.
  is a sequel to the titular first entry of the web series released on June 27, 2021, featuring Kanon's transformation into Kamen Rider Kanon Specter.

Novel
, written by Takuro Fukuda, is part of a series of spin-off novel adaptions of the Heisei Era Kamen Riders. The novel is split into three parts and focuses on the origin of the Gamma World, the history and destiny of Daitenkū-ji, and the events after Ghost Re:Birth: Kamen Rider Specter. The novel was released on November 17, 2017.

Video game
, is the third installment of the Kamen Rider: Battride War series, was released on February 26, 2016 for the PlayStation consoles (PlayStation 3, PlayStation 4, and PlayStation Vita). It features characters from Kamen Rider Ghost, Kamen Rider Drive, characters in previous versions of the game that were included as NPCs or assistants, as well as the Shōwa era Kamen Riders.

Cast
: 
: 
: 
: 
: 
: 
: 
: 
: 
: 
: 
: 
: 
: 
: 
, : 
, : 
: 
: 
: 
: 
Ghost Driver Equipment Voice, Eyecon Driver G Voice: m.c.A.T
Mega Ulorder and Equipment Voice: Peter von Gomm
, Transformation Gamma Eyecon Voice: 
, 
: 
Narration:

Guest cast

: 
: 
: 
: 
: 
: 
: 
: 
: 
: 
Takeru's mother (49): 
:

Theme songs
Opening theme

Lyrics & Composition: Show Ayanocozey
Arrangement: Takeshi Kiuchi
Artist: Kishidan

References

External links
Official website at TV Asahi
Official website at Toei Company
Ghost Re:Birth website

 
Ghost
2015 Japanese television series debuts
2016 Japanese television series endings
TV Asahi original programming
Television series about ghosts
Japanese fantasy television series
Japanese supernatural television series
Japanese horror fiction television series